The Rushford Public Library is a library in Rushford, Minnesota.  It is a member of Southeastern Libraries Cooperating, the SE Minnesota library region.

References

External links 
 GoogleMap to library
 Online Library Catalog
 Southeastern Libraries Cooperating

Southeastern Libraries Cooperating
Buildings and structures in Fillmore County, Minnesota
Education in Fillmore County, Minnesota